Van Wijk is a Dutch toponymic surname. "Wijk" may refer to  Wijk bij Duurstede or a number of other towns, including Wijk near Leusden, Beverwijk, Rijswijk, Waalwijk, and Wijk aan Zee. 12,750 people in the Netherlands carried the name in 2007. Alternative forms are van Wijck, van der Wijk, van Wyk (the common Afrikaans form), and van Wyck (mostly in the United States). Notable people with the surname include:

Van Wijk
Dennis van Wijk (born 1962), Dutch footballer and manager
Jack van Wijk (born 1959), Dutch computer scientist
Jan van Wijk (born 1962), Dutch racing cyclist
Joop van Wijk (born 1950), Dutch film director
Kevin van Wijk (born 1989), Dutch basketball player
L. M. van Wijk (born 1946), Dutch businessman
Michael Van Wijk (born 1952), English bodybuilder, actor and television presenter
 (1880–1941), Dutch linguist
Remco van Wijk (born 1972), Dutch field hockey player
Uco van Wijk (1924–1966), Dutch astronomer and educator
Van Wijck
 (born 1950), Flemish radio and television presenter
Jaak van Wijck (1870–1946), Dutch painter
Van Asch van Wijck
C. C. van Asch van Wijck (1900–1932), Dutch artist and sculptor
Titus van Asch van Wijck (1849–1902), Dutch governor of Suriname, after whom the Van Asch Van Wijck Mountains were named
Van der Wijck
Aart van der Wijck (1840–1914), Dutch Governor-General of the Dutch East Indies
Johan Cornelis van der Wijck (1848–1919), Dutch military leader and governor of Aceh

See also
Van Wijk (crater), lunar impact crater named after Uco van Wijk
Wijck
Van Wyk

References

Dutch-language surnames
Surnames of Dutch origin